The Canadian Remote Sensing Society (CRSC) is a learned society devoted to remote sensing in Canada.
CRSC publishes the Canadian Journal of Remote Sensing.

See also
 Canadian Cartography Association

References

Remote sensing organizations
Learned societies of Canada